Richard Allen Maloney (born September 22, 1964) is an American college baseball coach, the head coach at Ball State since the start of the 2013 season. He is the former head coach of the Michigan Wolverines where he compiled a record of 341–244 in 10 seasons, from 2003 to 2012. He led the Wolverines to four consecutive NCAA tournament appearances (2005–2008) and was the Big Ten Coach of the Year in 2007 and 2008.

From 1996 to 2002, he was the head coach at Ball State. He was named the MAC Baseball Coach of the year in 1998 and 2001. From 1998 to 2001, the Cardinals finished first in the MAC West for four straight seasons.

Head coaching record
The following is a table of Maloney's yearly records as an NCAA Division I head baseball coach.

References

External links

 Ball State profile

1964 births
Living people
Western Michigan Broncos baseball players
Pulaski Braves players
Sumter Braves players
Durham Bulls players
Greenville Braves players
Western Michigan Broncos baseball coaches
Ball State Cardinals baseball coaches
Michigan Wolverines baseball coaches
Sportspeople from Michigan